"Put Your Head on My Shoulder" is a song written by Canadian-born singer-songwriter Paul Anka. Anka's version was recorded in August 1958 at Bell Sound Studios in New York City, three weeks before he recorded his no. 1 hit "Lonely Boy", and was released as a single on August 17, 1959, by ABC-Paramount as catalog number 4510040. It was arranged and conducted by Don Costa. The B-side was "Don't Ever Leave Me". "Put Your Head on My Shoulder" became very successful, reaching No. 2 on the Billboard Hot 100 (kept out of the No. 1 spot by Bobby Darin's recording of "Mack the Knife"). It was his third top five hit of 1959. In Canada the song reached No. 4 on the CHUM Charts.

Cover and foreign language versions 
The song was again popular when it was covered and released as a single by The Lettermen in 1968. This version peaked at No. 44 on the Billboard Hot 100; it was more successful on the Easy Listening chart, where it peaked at No. 8.

Mexican singer Enrique Guzmán recorded a Spanish version in the 1960s titled "Tu cabeza en mi hombro". In Latin America, this cover is even more popular than the original one. Chilean singer Myriam Hernández recorded this version in a duet with Paul Anka himself in its original version.

Australian singer Derek Redfern covered the song, which peaked at number 71 on the Australian Kent Music Report in 1974.

American singer Leif Garrett released a cover of the song in 1978, which eventually reached number 58 on the Billboard Hot 100.

American rapper and singer Doja Cat sampled it in her 2021 song "Freak". The rhythm is similar between the two songs as well, heard throughout.

Former-Menudo band Puerto Rican singer Robby Rosa and the Brazilian duo "Gabriela e Tatiana" recorded Portuguese versions in the 1980s, Robby's version being "Com você nos meus sonhos" and Gabriela and Tatiana's version being "Essa mão no meu ombro".

In popular culture
A mashed up version of Doja Cat's "Streets" containing the first 12 seconds of "Put Your Head on My Shoulder" became a TikTok challenge known as the "Silhouette Challenge".

The song is featured in the 2004 videogame Hitman: Contracts, playing from a Gramophone in one of the rooms during the 2nd mission of the game.

Charts

All-time charts

References

External links
 Lyrics at oldielyrics.com
 

1959 songs
1959 singles
1968 singles
1978 singles
Songs written by Paul Anka
Paul Anka songs
The Lettermen songs
Leif Garrett songs
Song recordings produced by Al De Lory
ABC Records singles
Capitol Records singles
Atlantic Records singles
1950s ballads